Baron Sándor Hatvany-Deutsch (1852 – 1913) was a leading Hungarian Jewish industrialist, business magnate, philanthropist, investor and art patron. He led the family's sugar company with its factories Nagy-Surányi Cukorgyár és Finomító Rt. (est. 1854, Nagysurány), Hatvani Cukorgyár Rt. (est. 1889, Hatvan), Oroszkai Cukorgyár Rt. (est. 1893, Oroszka), Vas megyei Cukorgyár Rt. (est. 1895, Sárvár) and the Alföldi Cukorgyár Rt. (est. 1910, Sarkad) which made him one of the wealthiest persons in Austria-Hungary. He founded in 1902 with Ferenc Chorin the National Alliance of Industrialists (Gyáriparosok Országos Szövetsége (GYOSZ)) and was the first vice president of the association. According to Forbes he was the 4th richest person in Hungary on the turn of the 19th century with a net worth of 25–30 million Hungarian pengő.

Life 

His father, József Deutsch, was knighted for his economic achievements in 1879 by the Emperor and allowed to use the prefix 'de Hatvan'. After his studies, Sándor Deutsch de Hatvan joined the family trading business, and with the help of his cousins, made it into a major player in the sugar industry. Through their firm, Ignatz Deutsch & Sons, founded in Arad in 1822 and later moved to Budapest, the cousins grew sugar beet on large estates, set up refineries across Hungary for processing and exported their sugar on world markets. Although sugar was the source of the vast Hatvany fortune, the family was also involved in flour mills and grain trading, banking, among other activities.

In 1908, Sándor was made a baron by Franz Joseph I of Austria, became a member of the Senate, and assumed the name Hatvany-Deutsch. Sándor Hatvany-Deutsch participated in the creation of the National Association of Hungarian Industrialists in 1902, supported hospitals and sponsored a theater in Budapest.

His son Baron Ferenc Hatvany would accumulate Hungary's most valuable collection of paintings before it was seized by the Nazis during World War II. Another son, Baron  became a gifted Hungarian writer.

See also 
 Hatvan, Hatvani (Hatvany, Hatvanyi)

References 

 Isaac Landman, The Universal Jewish Encyclopedia, Vol. 5, p. 249.

External links 
 https://web.archive.org/web/20070707021245/http://www.hungarianquarterly.com/no150/053.html Hungary's Pillaged Art Heritage: The Fate of the Hatvany Collection - By László Mravik
 https://web.archive.org/web/20120307223223/http://www.ulpiushaz.hu/doc/frankfurti_katalogus.pdf Baron Lajos Hatvany - Men and Gentlemen
 https://web.archive.org/web/20110723142633/http://www.hatvanymuzeum.net/gyujtemenyek/torteneti/24 Hatvany Lajos Múzeum: Hatvany Deutsch Dynasty (Hungarian language)

1852 births
1913 deaths
People from Arad, Romania
Austro-Hungarian Jews
Barons of Austria
Hungarian nobility
Hungarian investors
Hungarian industrialists
Hungarian chief executives
Hungarian bankers
Hungarian Jews
19th-century Hungarian businesspeople
Sandor